Queer coding is the subtextual coding of a character in media as queer. Though such a character's sexual identity may not be explicitly confirmed within their respective work or they may in fact be straight despite their queer mannerisms, a character might be coded as queer through the use of traits and stereotypes recognisable to the audience. Such traits are greatly varied, but traits of exaggerated masculinity and femininity, vanity, and hypersexuality are frequent. Queer coding is a concept both in the discussion of media portrayal of LGBT people and academic research involving queer theory or gender studies.

History

The idea of non-explicit queer coding likely stems from the strict regulations of how queer characters were able to be portrayed in the early days of film-making. In 1930, the Hays Code was established as a standard for what was allowed to be shown on the big screen. According to the code, films were not allowed to portray "perverse" subjects such as homosexuality, which inevitably led to the portrayal of non-explicit queer characters.  The trend of the inclusivity of queer characters in a subtextual way likely bled into modern portrayals of queer characters. One scholar, Jo Johnson, argued that Jerry in the Tom & Jerry cartoons had an androgynous design, even if feminized, and noted a possible homoerotic subtext between Jerry and Tom, especially when there is cross-dressing. Johnson pointed to the 1966 short "Jerry-Go-Round", by Chuck Jones, as having a coded same-sex relationship between Jerry, who was gendered by Jones as female, and a female elephant who wears a pink tutu. She argued that the episode's ending could be read as a "prophetic depiction of Gay Pride". Cade M. Olmstead, an interdisciplinary philosophy scholar, built upon Johnson's work. He argued that Tom and Jerry "subverts normalized gender and sexuality structures" through theatrical play and performance, transgressing the normal construction of gender. Despite the queer coding in "Bugs Bunny" and "Tom & Jerry" cartoons, as scholars Deborah A. Fisher, Douglas L. Hill, Joel W. Grube, and Enid L. Gruber noted, before 1970, almost no gay characters were on television, and they remained relatively absent "until the 1990s". Continuing from the late 1980s, villains in Disney films which were queer coded appeared in this decade. Commentary on the treatment of LGBT+ characters in film is made in the 1995 documentary The Celluloid Closet, and is one of the first instances in which the idea of queer coding is presented to the public.

Time Squad, which aired from 2001 to 2003 on Cartoon Network, arguably had an LGBTQ character. In 2012, the voice actor of Larry 3000, Mark Hamill, implied that Larry could easily have been interpreted as gay, due to his femininity and presentation as the "gay best friend" to Cleopatra in "Shop like an Egyptian", even though Larry has stated on multiple occasions he dislikes humans in general. However, the show never directly stated his sexuality. Even so, Hamill described Larry 3000 as fierce and flamboyant. In 2019, Klaudia Amenábar, writing for The Mary Sue, argued that Cassandra in Rapunzel's Tangled Adventure was a gay coded character who had feelings for the show's protagonist, Rapunzel.

Villains

Because of the Hays Code, positive portrayals of homosexual characters were barred, and the only characters in fiction that could be perceived as homosexuals had evil roles and were punished throughout the work. Thus, villains became noted in particular to have effeminate characteristics, behaviors or gestures that could be perceived as LGBTI. Disney characters have attracted attention because their films are popular among children. Examples include:

 Governor Ratcliffe in Pocahontas, who is the only male character with makeup, braided hair and bows, and wears pink.
 Ursula in The Little Mermaid, was inspired by the drag queen Divine.
 Scar in The Lion King, who has mannered gestures.
 Captain Hook in Peter Pan
 The character 'HIM' in The Powerpuff Girls, who dresses in a tutu and heels.

Impact
Queer coding is similar to queerbaiting, but the queer coding of a character is neutral and intrinsic to the work, unlike queerbaiting, which often invokes queerness in order to draw viewership. However, queer coding may have a negative impact on perceptions of queerness in media; villains are often queer-coded, leading to the pejorative perception of queer traits. Critics have noted the Walt Disney Company's attribution of queer characteristics and behaviors to villainous or antagonistic characters. 

Gaston and LeFou in the 1991 film Beauty and the Beast and  Jafar from the 1992 film Aladdin were created by an openly gay animator named Andreas Deja, and sang music by Howard Ashman, who was also openly gay. The fact that Deja had also worked on Scar in The Lion King and the titular character in Hercules, for example, has been discussed as an influence on the development of some Disney characters.

This queer coding had its disadvantages, with networks not wanting to show overt representation. Animator Rebecca Sugar argued that it is "really heavy" for a kid to only exist "as a villain or a joke" in an animated series. In 2011, Deja told news.com.au Disney would have a "family that has two dads or two mums" if they find the "right kind of story with that kind of concept." However, other critics criticized such queer-coded villains as contributing to "homophobic discourse" and equating queerness with evil itself. Other critics have claimed that this attribution can lead to a negative association between queerness and immoral, licentious behavior.

In February 2021, producer Ralph Farquhar said that in The Proud Family, which aired on the Disney Channel from 2001 to 2005, they had to use "code to talk about if Michael was gay, to talk about sexuality" and to be "sort of underhanded about it." He said this changed with The Proud Family: Louder and Prouder with the biggest changes to the show are "gender identity, obviously racial identity and quote-unquote wokeness,” and said that sexuality can be "sort of in your face with it a lot more," manifesting itself in the storytelling.

See also
Media portrayal of LGBT people
He never married
Medieval singlewomen

References 

Queer-related mass media
Neologisms
Queer theory
Euphemisms